Moses Allen may refer to:

 Moses Allen (minister) (1748–1779), minister of Midway, Georgia during the American Revolution
 Moses Allen (musician) (1907–1983), American jazz bassist
 Moses Allen (settler), first settler in Hillsdale County, Michigan